Lethal is an album by the English punk rock band Cockney Rejects released in 1990.

Track listing
 "Bad Man Down" (3.45)
 "Penitentiary" (4.26)
 "Struttin' My Stuff" (3.35)
 "Lethal Weapon" (3.42)
 "Rough Diamond" (4.51)
 "Go Get It" (3.05)
 "Down 'N' Out" (2.48)
 "One Way Ticket" (6.11)
 "Once a Rocker" (5.37)
 "Take Me Higher" (4.05)
 "Down the Line" (3.17)
 "Mean City" (3.30)
 "See You Later" (4.45)

References

1990 albums
Cockney Rejects albums